Magsaysay, officially the Municipality of Magsaysay, is a 4th class municipality in the province of Misamis Oriental, Philippines. According to the 2020 census, it has a population of 36,803 people.

Magsaysay was formerly known as Linugos. It acquired its current name in 1957.

Geography

Barangays
Magsaysay is politically subdivided into 25 barangays.

Climate

Demographics

Economy

Tourism
The Divine Mercy Monument was built December 2018 at the top of the hill in the barangay of Kibungsod and was inaugurated and blessed. It is the second monument of the province 10 years after the inauguration of Divine Mercy Shrine in El Salvador, Misamis Oriental since 2008.

See also
List of renamed cities and municipalities in the Philippines

References

External links
 [ Philippine Standard Geographic Code]
Philippine Census Information
Local Governance Performance Management System

Municipalities of Misamis Oriental